George Pope may refer to:

 George Pope (cricketer) (1911–1993), English cricketer 
 George Uglow Pope (1820–1908), Christian missionary
 George D. Pope (1867–1927), political figure on Prince Edward Island